Khanjyan (also Romanized as Khanjian) is a town in the Armavir Province of Armenia. The town founded as a sovkhoz (collective farm) in 1957 and named in honor of Aghasi Khanjian, first secretary of the Communist Party of Armenia.

See also 
Armavir Province

References 

World Gazeteer: Armenia – World-Gazetteer.com

Populated places in Armavir Province
Populated places established in 1957
Cities and towns built in the Soviet Union